Galymbek Zhumatov (Ғалымбек Сағымбайұлы Жұматов; born 15 October 1952 in Ulguli, Kazakhstan) is a Kazakh writer, poet, member of the Union of Writers of Kazakhstan, and the founder of the newspaper Shahar.

Life
Galymbek Zhumatov born in the family of a veteran of the Second World War. His father Sagymbai Zhumatov participated in the Battle of Stalingrad and was seriously injured. After high school, he was served in the Soviet Army. Service was held in Lviv. After serving in the Army Zhumatov arrives at the Faculty of Journalism in the Kazakh State University. After graduation, he began working in the regional newspaper "Kyzyl tu" (now Saryarka samaly), first as a correspondent, then deputy editor. Between 1991 and 1995, correspondent of the republican newspaper "Halyk kenesi." In 2007 Galymbek Zhumatov founded the first in the Pavlodar Region the commercial newspaper in the state language "Shaһar." Zhumatov now is the chief editor of the literary magazine "Nayzatas."

Work

Writing style
Galymbek Zhumatov began literary career as children's writer. His first book "Трактор қалай жасалады?" ("How tractor built?") tells about the story of a boy who found himself on the Pavlodar tractor plant. This book was published in 1984. Two years later, in 1986, he published a book "Ала көжек" ("The Motley Rabbit"), which the author brings fame. In addition to prose works Zhumatov writes poetry. In 2005 he released a collection of songs "Жеңіс жалауын желбіреткен" (Jeńis jalaýyn jelbiretken) about the collection of World War II veterans.

Works
Traktor qalaı jasalady? (How tractor built?) (1984)
Ala kójek (The Motley Rabbit) (1986)
Jalǵas – jaýyngerdiń balasy (Jalǵas – son of war) (1992)
Keń aýlaly úıdenbiz (Children of a large yard) (1992)
Biz –  42 árippiz (We – 42 letters) (2003)
Jeńis jalaýyn jelbiretken (Banner of Victory) (2005)
Ana ósııeti (Memory of mother) (2006)
Saǵynysh sazy (Melodies of longing) (2006)
Kemeldi eldiń Kemeri (Kemer's Life) (2007)
Máshhúr taǵlymy (Legacy of the Máshhúr Júsip) (2008)
Sary beleń (Yellow time) (2008)
Astanam ásem-asqaq án (Songs about Astana) (2008)
Arnaly aǵys (Life path) (2013)

Songs
Jeńis joly (The path of victory) (2005)
Maıdanger atalarǵa (Grandfathers-wars) (2005)

References

Links
 Irtysh district library

1952 births
Living people
Kazakhstani journalists
Kazakhstani poets
Al-Farabi Kazakh National University alumni
20th-century Kazakhstani writers
21st-century Kazakhstani writers